

Television

2010s

2000s

1990s

1980s

1970s

1960s

Radio

2010s

2000s

1990s

1980s

1970s

1960s

References

Los Angeles Kings
broadcasters
Los Angeles Kings announcers
Prime Sports
Fox Sports Networks
Bally Sports